Jazz at the Musikverein is a 1998 album by André Previn accompanied by bassist David Finck of the music of George Gershwin.

Reception

The album was reviewed by Ken Dryden at Allmusic who wrote that Previn "faces the same challenge every jazz musician must address: finding new paths through Gershwin's frequently recorded masterpieces". Dryden highlighted Previn's "train-like bassline substitution to open and close a rollicking take" of "They All Laughed" and his "laid-back" and "bluesy treatment" of "Oh, Lady Be Good".

Track listing
''All music composed by George Gershwin with all lyrics written by Ira Gershwin
 "They All Laughed" – 3:19
 "Someone to Watch Over Me" – 5:03
 "Oh, Lady Be Good" – 4:20
 "A Foggy Day" – 5:51
 "Soon"/"Do It Again!" – 5:37
 "I Got Rhythm" – 5:14  
 "Embraceable You" – 4:56
 "He Loves and She Loves"/"Love Is Here to Stay" – 6:54
 "Fascinating Rhythm" – 3:35
 "Isn't It a Pity?" – 4:44
 "Boy! What Love Has Done To Me!"/"I've Got a Crush on You" – 4:32
 "Love Walked In" – 6:05
 "The Man I Love" – 5:27
 "'S Wonderful" – 6:22

Personnel
André Previn – piano
David Finck – double bass

Production
Fred Munzmaier – art direction
Philipp Nedel – assistant engineer
John Newton – balance engineer
Richard Evidon – booklet editor
Al Hirschfeld – illustrations
Edward Jablonski – liner notes
Edward Steichen – photography
Ellyn Kusmin – producer

References

1998 albums
André Previn albums
Deutsche Grammophon albums
George and Ira Gershwin tribute albums